Shmidtovo is a rural locality (a village) in Russko-Yurmashsky Selsoviet, Ufimsky District, Bashkortostan, Russia. The population was 406 as of 2010. There are 76 streets.

Geography 
Shmidtovo is located 23 km southeast of Ufa (the district's administrative centre) by road. Yuzhnaya is the nearest rural locality.

References 

Rural localities in Ufimsky District